Sainte-Marie-sur-Mer is a former commune in the Pays de Retz, situated in the Loire-Atlantique département and in the French région of Pays de la Loire. From 1973, it was absorbed by the neighbouring commune of Pornic and from 1 July 2007 it became a subdivision of this commune.

The commune forms a part of Brittany, in the traditional county of Retz and in the historical Pays Nantais.

The inhabitants of Sainte-Marie are known as the Sanmaritains and Sanmaritaines.

Geography

Sainte-Marie-sur-Mer is a market town on the Côte de Jade, with a jagged coastline strewn with coves.

History
At one time, during the French First Republic, Sainte-Marie was known as Roche-Peltier.

The commune of Sainte-Marie was attached to that of Pornic on 1 June 1973 (under the terms of the Marcelin law of 16 July 1971).

On 16 May 2006 the Sanmaritains voted for the complete amalgamation of the communes of Sainte-Marie-sur-Mer and Pornic with 50.83% of the vote in favour (with a difference of just 47 votes out of more than 2800 voters). In effect, from 1973, Sainte-Marie-sur-Mer possessed a status of associated commune with Pornic and removed the deputy mayor of Sainte-Marie, Jean-François Cossé who had opposed the amalgamation of the two communes.

On 1 July 2007, after the acceptance by the prefect of the amalgamation of the communes of Pornic and Sainte-Marie-sur-Mer, the latter lost its status as associated commune and became a subdivision of Pornic .

List of mayors
Abbé Beaudouin -1823 
Bodin des Plantes 1823- 
Edouard Thomas -1828 
François Raffin 1828- (maire provisoire) 
Edouard Thomas -1852 
René Laraison 1852-1870
Michel Picot 1870-1884
François Maurice 1884-1886
Jules Galot 1886-
Guillon Constant 1886-
Souchlaud 
Bézier 
Rouhaud

After the amalgamation with the town of Pornic, Sainte-Marie-sur-Mer and the aforementioned Pornic came to represent a single electoral zone.

Demographics

Places and monuments
 Sainte-Marie church
 Le chateau de La Mossardière
 Commonwealth war graves in Ste. Marie Communal Cemetery

People from Sainte-Marie-sur-Mer
 René Babonneau

Resiting of the market
Since the end of March 2007 the market was moved creating a heated debate between tradesman, customers and the town hall. In the Courier of the Pays de Retz of 5 April 2007 the writer of the article spoke of a toxic atmosphere in the town.

See also
 Communes of the Loire-Atlantique department 
 Baie de Bourgneuf
 Côte de Jade
 Pays de Retz
 Pornic
 Pêcherie

References
¹ - Source : Ouest France.

External links
 Infobretagne.com - History of Pornic, Sainte-Marie and Clion

Notes

This article is based on the equivalent article from the French Wikipedia, consulted on March 6th 2008.

Former communes of Loire-Atlantique
Pornic